The Center for Southeastern Tropical Advanced Remote Sensing (CSTARS) is a ground station owned by the University of Miami's Rosenstiel School of Marine and Atmospheric Science that receives imagery data from a variety of remote sensing satellites.

Overview
The center's mission is to collect satellite imagery for environmental monitoring of hurricanes, volcanoes, landslides and other natural or man made disasters.

In 2000, the University of Miami purchased the United States Naval Observatory Secondary National Time Standard Facility. The purchase included  of land with several buildings and a 20-meter antenna once used for Very Long Baseline Interferometry. This large antenna is currently used to support scientific communications with the Antarctic (on behalf of the National Science Foundation). Two 11 meter X-band antennas were added to create a high bandwidth data reception capability for the downlink of satellite image data. Scientists and staff perform research and analysis activities on-site as well.

The station mask covers a very large area stretching from Hudson Bay in northeastern Canada down to northern South America in the south.  The mask includes Central America, the eastern Pacific Ocean, the Caribbean Basin, the Gulf of Mexico and much of the Eastern US including Eastern Seaboard.  CSTARS provides a VoIP communication system for the Amundsen–Scott South Pole Station.

Admiral John Stavridis, former commanding officer of United States Southern Command, wrote the following about CSTARS in his book Partnership for the Americas

Projects

Hurricane Katrina Damage Assessment and Disaster Relief 
CSTARS played a vital role in the damage assessment and relief efforts of New Orleans and the Gulf Coast in the aftermath of Hurricane Katrina. The first remote sensing images illustrating the extent of the flooding in New Orleans were collected at CSTARS.

Project with Department of Homeland Security (DHS) 
The United States Department of Homeland Security has included CSTARS as one of its "Centers of Excellence" so that CSTARS will work with the Stevens Institute of Technology to research port security and maritime monitoring issues.

Project with Office of Naval Research (ONR) 
The Office of Naval Research awarded CSTARS a grant to support satellite based research studies on internal waves and typhoons in the western Pacific Ocean.

Palau
CSTARS participated in a Pew Charitable Trusts study to examine how to protect one of the largest Marine Protected (MPA) areas in the world through the utilization of commercially available earth imaging satellites.

References

External links
Official website

Remote sensing research institutes
Earth sciences organizations
Meteorological organizations
Geographical technology
University of Miami
Geographic data and information organizations in the United States